Canadian Water Network (CWN) is a non-profit organization that helps decision-makers in the water sector address complex challenges. Its mission is to advance, accelerate and improve water management decisions in Canada.  without advocating for a specific position.

Its headquarters are currently located in Waterloo, Ontario on the University of Waterloo campus. Canadian Water Network is a member of the Global Water Research Coalition (GWRC), an international water research alliance.

History 
Canadian Water Network was established in 2001 as a Network of Centres of Excellence (NCE) in response to Walkerton's drinking water crisis. From 2001 – 2015, CWN was funded by the Canadian Government to help decision-makers access and apply relevant research to manage risks to the safety, security and abundance of Canada's water resources. In 2015, Canadian Water Network transitioned to a self-sustaining organization. It is governed by a board of directors from academia, government, municipalities and industry. The CEO of Canadian Water Network is Bernadette Conant.

Canadian Municipal Water Consortium 
In 2009, Canadian Water Network established the Canadian Municipal Water Consortium. The Consortium's mandate is to connect utilities, municipalities, researchers, industry, government and other organizations to address Canada's municipal water management challenges. It is led by a group of senior decision makers from 20 municipalities and utilities across Canada and represents 61% of the Canadian population.

Canadian Water Network and the Consortium host the Blue Cities conference annually in May.

Projects 
Canadian Water Network initiatives include collaborative research, expert reviews, national stakeholder meetings and knowledge mobilization on issues such as:

 Resiliency to climate change 
 The impacts of nutrients and contaminants on watersheds
 Financial sustainability of drinking water, wastewater and stormwater systems
 Lead in drinking water

In 2017, Canadian Water Network led a National Expert Panel on Canada's challenges and opportunities to address contaminants in wastewater. The findings from the panel were released in a report in 2018.

Since 2004, Canadian Water Network has offered a leadership development program for students and young professionals in water.

References

External links
 

Environmental organizations based in Ontario
Waterloo, Ontario